De Prins may refer to:

Alwin de Prins (born 29 October 1978), former Belgian swimmer
De Prins der Geïllustreerde Bladen, former Dutch magazine

See also 
 Prins